A box-office bomb, or box-office disaster, is a film that is unprofitable or considered highly unsuccessful during its theatrical run. Although any film for which the production, marketing, and distribution costs combined exceed the revenue after release has technically "bombed", the term is more frequently used for major studio releases that were highly anticipated, extensively marketed and expensive to produce that ultimately failed commercially.

Causes

Negative word of mouth
With the advent of social media platforms such as Facebook and Twitter in the 2000s, word of mouth regarding new films is easily spread and has had a marked effect on box office performance. A film's ability or failure to attract positive or negative commentary can strongly impact its performance at the box office, especially on the opening weekend.

External circumstances
Occasionally, films may underperform because of issues largely unrelated to the content of the film, such as the timing of the film's release. This was one of the reasons given for the commercial failure of Intolerance, D. W. Griffith's follow-up to The Birth of a Nation. Owing to production delays, the film was not released until late 1916, when the widespread antiwar sentiment it reflected had started to shift in favor of American entry into World War I. Another example is the 2015 critically panned docudrama about FIFA entitled United Passions, which may have been adversely affected by bad publicity relating to a corruption scandal. It was released in theaters in the United States at the same time FIFA's leaders were under investigation for fraud and corruption, combined with general indifference to Association football, and the film grossed only $918 at the US box office in its opening weekend.

Sometimes, a film's performance may be adversely affected by national crisis or a disaster, such as the September 11 attacks in 2001, Hurricane Harvey in 2017, and the COVID-19 pandemic.

High production costs

In evaluating box-office gross numbers, it is important to keep in mind that not all that money is returned to the film studio. Some of the gross is kept by the film exhibitors and the film distributor. The scratch formula for making a rough estimate of a studio's portion of the gross is that the studio usually gets half.

A large budget can cause a film to fail financially, even when it performs reasonably well at the box office; 1980's Heaven's Gate, for example, exceeded its planned production schedule by three months, causing its budget to inflate from $12 million to $44 million. The film only earned $3.5 million at the box office.

For the 2005 film Sahara, its budget ballooned to $281.2 million for production, distribution, and other expenses. The film earned $119 million in theaters and $202.9 million overall with television and other subsidies included, resulting in a net loss of $78.3 million. In 2012, Disney reported losses of $200 million on John Carter. The film had made a considerable $234 million worldwide, but this was short of its $250 million budget plus worldwide advertising.

The 2007 film The Golden Compass had a production budget of $200 million. To be able to fund the film, New Line Cinema had to sell all of the film's international distribution rights to various film distributors around the world. The film underperformed domestically, but was an international success; however, New Line did not have a cut of the international box office. These events were major factors in New Line becoming a division of Warner Bros. Pictures.

Recovery
Films that are initially viewed as "flops" may recover income elsewhere. Several films have underperformed in their countries of origin, but have been sufficiently successful internationally to recoup losses or even become financial successes. Films may also recover money through international distribution, sales to television syndication, distribution outside of cinemas, and releases on home media. The 1995 post-apocalyptic action film Waterworld  was the most expensive film ever made at the time undergoing significant production difficulties. While it performed relatively well in the US box office, it did not initially turn a profit and became known as a box office flop. However, international box office takings and video sales led it to turn a profit.

Other films have succeeded long after cinema release by becoming cult films or being re-evaluated over time. High-profile films fitting this description include Vertigo, Blade Runner, The Wizard of Oz, It's a Wonderful Life, Citizen Kane, Willy Wonka & the Chocolate Factory and The Shawshank Redemption, each of which initially lost money at the box office, but have since become popular.

Studio failure
It is common for a single film's lackluster performance to push its studio in financial losses. However, in extreme cases, a bomb may push its studio into bankruptcy or closure. Examples of this include United Artists (Heaven's Gate) and Carolco Pictures (Cutthroat Island). The Golden Compass was a success at the international box office and grossed $372 million worldwide; however, its underperformance at the box office in North America was seen as a significant factor in influencing Warner Bros.' decision to take direct control of New Line Cinema.

In 2001, Square Pictures, a division of Square, released its only film, Final Fantasy: The Spirits Within. It received mixed reviews from critics and failed to recover its $145 million cost. Following the film's struggles, Square Pictures did not make any more films. They are now a consolidated subsidiary of Square Enix as Visual Works. In 2011, Mars Needs Moms was the last film released by ImageMovers Digital before Disney's stake got absorbed by ImageMovers to a loss of nearly $140 million – the largest box-office bomb of all time in nominal dollar terms. Despite this loss, the decision to close the production company had been made a year prior to the film's release.

Independent films
The 2006 independent movie Zyzzyx Road made just $30 at the US box office. With a budget of $1.2 million and starring Tom Sizemore and Katherine Heigl, its tiny revenue is due to its limited box-office release – just six days in a single theater in Dallas for the purpose of meeting Screen Actors Guild requirements – rather than its ability to attract viewers. According to co-star Leo Grillo, it sold six tickets, two of which were to cast members.

Previously, the 2000 British film Offending Angels had become notorious for taking in less than £100 (~$150) at the box office. It had a £70,000 (~$105,000) budget but was panned by critics including the BBC, who called it a "truly awful pile of garbage", and Total Film, who called it "irredeemable".

In 2011, the film The Worst Movie Ever! opened to just $11 at the US box office. It played in only one theater.

Box-office flop
While terms like box-office flop (also box-office failure) and box-office bomb are sometimes used interchangeably, they are not the same. A box-office bomb is technically worse than box-office flop.

See also

 List of biggest box-office bombs
 List of films considered the worst
 List of films considered the best

References

External links

 GetBack.com: Biggest Film Flops and Fiascoes
 Biggest Box-Office Bombs of All Time – Inside Movies Blog

Bomb
Film and video terminology